Highland Community Unit School District 5 is a school district based in Highland, Illinois, and it has 6 schools. The Superintendent of the school district is Michael Sutton.

Current schools 
Alhambra Primary
Grantfork Upper Elementary
Highland Primary 
Highland Elementary
Highland Middle School
Highland High School

External links
District web site

School districts in Illinois
Education in Madison County, Illinois